"Hearts On Fire" is a song performed by Bryan Adams on his 1987 album Into the Fire.  Written by Adams and Jim Vallance in Vancouver, British Columbia, Canada in 1984 it was not completed until 1986 or early 1987 when Adams went to record in September 1986 at Cliffhanger Studios, West Vancouver (Adams's home studio at the time). The song was mixed by co-producer Bob Clearmountain in January 1987 at AIR Studios in London.

Background
The song was partially written at the time Adams and Vallance were writing for the album Reckless and not completed until the album recording started.  Vallance comments on his website that he believes that the sounds were more suited to "Reckless" than "Into the Fire", Adams however believes the song was perfect for the album as it made a direct connection between the two albums for those that liked the previous work. Spreading the connection ever farther to his subsequent album, Waking Up the Neighbours Adams re-used the opening riff to the song for the track House Arrest.

Live performance
Adams often plays this song at his live concerts with prolonged guitar solo battles with his guitarist Keith Scott.

Chart performance

Personnel
Bryan Adams - rhythm guitar, vocals
Jim Vallance - percussion
Keith Scott - rhythm guitar, lead guitar, backing vocals
Tommy Mandel - organ
Dave Taylor - bass
Mickey Curry - drums

References

1987 singles
Bryan Adams songs
Songs written by Bryan Adams
Songs written by Jim Vallance
A&M Records singles
Song recordings produced by Bob Clearmountain